Odontopharyngidae is a family of nematodes belonging to the order Diplogasterida.

Genera:
 Odontopharynx

References

Nematodes